Luke Sharry (born 9 March 1990) is an English footballer who plays for Tadcaster Albion, as a midfielder.

Career
Born in Leeds, Sharry was a member of Bradford City's youth team, and made his senior debut for them in the Football League on 2 May 2009, in the final game of the 2008–09 season, against Chesterfield. Sharry had previously spent a one-month loan spell at Barrow in January 2009, where he made three appearances in the league for them. He signed a new contract with Bradford City in June 2009, but was released from his contract at the end of the 2009–10 season, having made four appearances for them in all competitions. He then went on trial with Grimsby Town in April 2010.

He signed for Guiseley in July 2010 after appearing for them in pre-season friendlies, and he signed a new contract with them in July 2011. However, he was released two weeks later, and later joined Worksop Town.

After spells with Garforth Town and Ossett Town, Sharry moved to Droylsden in January 2014. Sharry then played for FC United of Manchester before moving to Frickley Athletic in March 2014. After returning to Droylsden, Sharry moved to Ossett Albion in December 2014.

In August 2022, Sharry signed for Eccleshill United before moving to Tadcaster Albion in October of the same year.

References

1990 births
Living people
Footballers from Leeds
English footballers
Association football midfielders
Bradford City A.F.C. players
Barrow A.F.C. players
Guiseley A.F.C. players
Worksop Town F.C. players
Garforth Town A.F.C. players
Ossett Town F.C. players
Droylsden F.C. players
F.C. United of Manchester players
Frickley Athletic F.C. players
Ossett Albion A.F.C. players
Yorkshire Amateur A.F.C. players
Eccleshill United F.C. players
Tadcaster Albion A.F.C. players
English Football League players
National League (English football) players
Northern Premier League players
Northern Counties East Football League players